Love in a Fallen City is a 2009 Chinese television series based on Eileen Chang's 1943 novella of the same name. The series was directed by Mengji and produced by Zou Jingzhi, who also wrote the adapted screenplay.

Cast
Chen Shu as Bai Liusu
Huang Jue as Fan Liuyuan
Wang Xuebing as Tang Yiyuan
Liu Yihan as Bai Baoluo
Wang Yuanke as Hong Lian
Zheng Yuzhi
Kong Xiangyu
Ning Wentong
Zhang Zhihua
Guan Shaozeng
Chen Liangping as Bai Liangyue
Cao Yanyan 
Gao Liang as Bai Liangyong
Zhang Xixi
Cheng Lisha

Broadcast
 Taiwan — Much TV (January 19, 2009)
 China — CCTV-8 (March 14, 2009)
 Hong Kong — Asia Television (March 1, 2010, dubbed in Cantonese)

2009 Chinese television series debuts
2009 Chinese television series endings
China Central Television original programming
Television shows based on Chinese novels
Mandarin-language television shows
Chinese period television series
Chinese romance television series
Television shows written by Zou Jingzhi
Television series by Huace Media